Georgia Baker (born 21 September 1994) is an Australian professional racing cyclist. She rode in the women's team pursuit at the 2016 UCI Track Cycling World Championships.

Cycling career
After taking a break from road racing in 2016 with the High5 Dream Team to focus on her Rio Olympics campaign, Orica-Scott announced signing Baker to race in the Women's World Tour team for 2017.

In her first European race for the Orica-Scott team at the end of May, Baker was among the 90 non-finishers of 121 that started at Gooik–Geraardsbergen–Gooik.

Baker in her second race on the opening stage at The Women's Tour at the start of June after a racing heart and sharp pains were felt in her chest and arm, exercising caution having lost her father to a heart attack in 2015, she withdrew from the race. She was diagnosed with supraventricular tachycardia, while not life-threatening, needed to be treated to continue as an athlete. She was booked in for surgery in early August, in the hopes to resume training for a mixed road and track season in the run up to the 2018 Commonwealth Games. Following a successful surgery, Baker undertook a three-month training block in Australia before racing at the Oceania Track Championships in November 2017.

Baker qualified for the Tokyo 2020 Olympics. She was a member of the women's pursuit team. The team, consisting of Ashlee Ankudinoff, Georgia Baker, Annette Edmondson, Alexandra Manly and Maeve Plouffe, finished fifth.

At the 2022 Commonwealth Games, Baker won the gold medal in the women's team pursuit event alongside Sophie Edwards, Chloe Moran and Maeve Plouffe, setting a games record time of 4:14.06.

Major results
2014
 2nd Team pursuit, Oceania Track Championships
2015
 Oceania Track Championships
1st  Individual Pursuit
1st  Omnium
2nd Points race
2nd Team pursuit
 2nd Madison, Austral (with Danielle McKinnirey)
2016
 1st  Points race, Oceania Track Championships
2022
 1st  Road race, Commonwealth Games
 1st Stage 2 Thüringen Ladies Tour
 3rd  Team relay, UCI Road World Championships
 4th Scheldeprijs
 7th GP Oetingen

References

External links
  (archive)
 
 
 
 
 
 

1994 births
Living people
Australian female cyclists
Sportspeople from Launceston, Tasmania
Sportswomen from Tasmania
Cyclists from Tasmania
Australian track cyclists
Cyclists at the 2016 Summer Olympics
Olympic cyclists of Australia
UCI Track Cycling World Champions (women)
Cyclists at the 2018 Commonwealth Games
Commonwealth Games competitors for Australia
Cyclists at the 2020 Summer Olympics
20th-century Australian women
21st-century Australian women
Cyclists at the 2022 Commonwealth Games
Commonwealth Games gold medallists for Australia
Commonwealth Games medallists in cycling
Medallists at the 2022 Commonwealth Games